The Oxford Companion to Irish Literature is a 1996 book edited by Robert Welch.

In over 2,000 entries, the Companion to Irish Literature surveys the Irish literary landscape across sixteen centuries, describing its features and landmarks. Entries range from ogham writing, developed in the 4th century, to the fiction, poetry, and drama of the 1990s. There are accounts of authors as early as Adomnán, 7th-century Abbot of Iona, up to contemporary writers such as Roddy Doyle, Brian Friel, Seamus Heaney, and Edna O'Brien. Individual entries are provided for all major works, from Táin Bó Cuailnge - the Ulster saga reflecting the Celtic Iron Age - to Swift's Gulliver's Travels, Edgeworth's Castle Rackrent, Ó Cadhain's Cré na Cille, and Banville's The Book of Evidence.

The book also illuminates the historical contexts of these writers, and the events which sometimes directly inspired them - the Irish Famine of 1845-8, which provided a theme for novelists, poets, and memoirists from William Carleton to Patrick Kavanagh and Peadar Ó Laoghaire the founding of the Abbey Theatre and its impact on playwrights such as J. M. Synge and Padraic Colum; the Easter Rising that stirred Yeats to the `terrible beauty' of `Easter 1916'.

It offers information on general topics, ranging from the stage Irishman to Catholicism, Protestantism, the Irish language, and university education in Ireland; and on genres such as annals, bardic poetry, and folksong.

References

1996 non-fiction books
English-language books
Irish encyclopedias
Irish literature
Oxford University Press reference books